Borscht Belt Studies is an album by Jamie Saft which was released on the Tzadik label in 2009.

Reception

In his review for Allmusic, Thom Jurek notes that "Saft divides the album into musical sections that alternate by cut. Some compositions are based on blues, jazz, and Yiddish melodies, some in modern composition and vanguard classical music, and the closing track in reggae!...  It's a mysterious, labyrinthine piece that is a stunner in the end -- it reflects the rest of Borscht Belt Studies beautifully".

Track listing
All compositions by Jamie Saft
 "Issachar" - 5:15   
 "Hellenville" - 3:52   
 "Darkest Arts" - 3:30   
 "Pinkus" - 5:13   
 "The Pines" - 3:29   
 "Darash" - 4:13   
 "Solomon County" - 6:54   
 "Jews for Joseph (Maneri)" - 7:01   
 "Kutshers" - 4:34   
 "Azulai" - 3:44   
 "New Zion" - 4:58

Personnel
Jamie Saft - piano, Fender Rhodes
Ben Goldberg - clarinet (tracks 1, 3, 4, 6, 8 & 10)
Larry Grenadier - bass (track 11)
Craig Santiago - drums (track 11)

References

Tzadik Records albums
Jamie Saft albums
2011 albums